D. C. Gowri Shankar is an Indian politician and present MLA of Tumkur rural. He was elected to the Karnataka Legislative Assembly from Madhugiri in the 2008 Karnataka Legislative Assembly election as a member of the Janata Dal (Secular). After 2008 elections he contested as a JDS candidate for Tumkur rural constituency and lost by a small margin of 1500 votes and then again contested in 2018 elections and won in a margin of 5640 votes and became the MLA for second time and entered the assembly. Under the coalition government of JDS and Congress he chaired the MSIL foundation for 6 months and now he is the most successful MLA in Tumkur district from JDS Party.

References

External links
 J Narasimhaswamy Doddaballapur

Living people
21st-century Indian politicians
Janata Dal (Secular) politicians
Year of birth missing (living people)
Karnataka MLAs 2008–2013
Karnataka MLAs 2018–2023